is a Japanese publishing company focused on manga-related publication, including magazines and books. The company was established in November 1979. It publishes a manga magazine called Comic Gum.

Magazines published

Wink Up 
 is an idol magazine published since July 1988.

UP to boy 

, abbreviated as UTB, is a bimonthly idol magazine published since 1986.

COOLTRANS

+act.

Comic Gum 

 is a monthly seinen manga magazine started in 1996.

References

External links
Wani Books official website 
Wink Up website 

Book publishing companies in Tokyo
Magazine publishing companies in Tokyo
Distribution companies based in Tokyo
Manga distributors
Publishing companies established in 1979
Japanese companies established in 1979
Comic book publishing companies in Tokyo